Sergio Moreno (born 18 July 1950) is a Nicaraguan weightlifter. He competed in the men's lightweight event at the 1976 Summer Olympics.

References

External links
 
 

1950 births
Living people
Nicaraguan male weightlifters
Olympic weightlifters of Nicaragua
Weightlifters at the 1976 Summer Olympics
Place of birth missing (living people)